Colobognatha is a clade (formally considered a subterclass) of helminthomorph millipedes containing four orders: Platydesmida, Polyzoniida, Siphonocryptida, and Siphonophorida.

Description
The Colobognatha are united by several shared traits (synapomorphies). Males have two pairs of simple, leg-like gonopods, consisting of the rear leg pair of body segment 7 and the foreword-most leg pair of segment 8. They possess tubular defensive glands that open on the sides of the body, and lack a palp-like structure on their gnathochilaria. Other traits found in colobognathans, but not exclusively, include a distinctly narrow head, lack of Tömösváry organs, and no more than two pairs of ocelli.

References

Millipede taxonomy
Taxa named by Johann Friedrich von Brandt